This is a list of agrarian parties, that is, parties which explicitly rely on farmers as their main constituency and/or adhere to some form of agrarianism.

For a list of parties called Agrarian Party, Farmers' Party or Peasants' Party see Agrarian Party,  Farmers' Party and Peasants' Party, respectively. For a list of Nordic Agrarian parties see Nordic agrarian parties.

Active parties

Americas
 : Agrarian Labour Action Party
 : Minnesota Democratic–Farmer–Labor Party

Europe
 : Centre
 : Agrarian Party, Environmentalist Agrarian Party
 : Agrarian Party
 : Croatian Peasant Party of Bosnia and Herzegovina
 : People's Union, Agrarian National Union, Bulgarian Agrarian People's Union "Aleksandar Stamboliyski", Bulgarian Agrarian People's Union–United
 : Peasant Party, Democratic Peasants' Party
 : Rally for the Republic – Republican Party of Czechoslovakia, Agrarian Democratic Party
 : Venstre – Liberal Party
 : Union Party
 : Centre Party (in government), People's Union
 : Centre Party (in government), True Finns 
 : National Centre of Independents and Peasants, Hunting, Fishing, Nature, Tradition
 : Feeling of Community
 : Independent Smallholders, Agrarian Workers and Civic Party
 : Progressive Party, Centre Party
 : South Tyrolean People's Party
 : Farmers' Union (in government)
 : Lithuanian Centre Party, Farmers and Greens Union (in government)
 : Agrarian Party
 : Popular Movement
 : Farmer–Citizen Movement
 : Party for a European Future
 : Centre Party
 : People's Party, Self-Defense, AGROunia, Piast Faction
 : People's Monarchist Party
 : Christian Democratic National Peasants' Party, Democratic Union of Hungarians in Romania
 : United Peasant Party and People's Peasant Party
 : Party of the Hungarian Coalition
 : People's Party
 : Centre Party
 : Swiss People's Party
 : People's Party, Agrarian Party, Radical Party
 : National Distributist Party

Asia
 : Agrarian Party
 : Agrarian Party, Agrarian Labour Party
 : Butil Farmers Party
 : Peasant Party

Africa
 : Farmers' Voice Party

Oceania
 : Katter's Australian Party, National Party, Shooters, Fishers and Farmers Party

Former parties

Americas
 : National Autonomist Party
 : National Agrarian Party
 : United Farmers (specifically: United Farmers of Alberta, United Farmers of Ontario), Progressive Party (specifically: Progressive Party of Manitoba), Co-operative Commonwealth Federation
 : National Agrarian Party, National Party, Agrarian Labor Party
 : National Agrarian Party
 : Workers' Agrarian Party
 : Agrarian National Party
 : Democratic-Republican Party, Greenback Party, Populist Party, Farmer-Labor Party (specifically: Minnesota Farmer-Labor Party)
 : National Agrarian Party

Europe

 : Republican Party of Farmers and Peasants
 : Farmers' Party (Denmark)
 : Finnish Rural Party
 : Agricultural League, Bavarian Peasants' League, Christian-National Peasants' and Farmers' Party, German Farmers' Party, Schleswig-Holsteinische Bauern- und Landarbeiterdemokratie
 : Democratic Farmers' Party of Germany
 : Agrarian Party of Greece, Peasants and Workers Partyu
 : National Peasants' Party
 : Land League, Farmers' Party, Clann na Talmhan
 : Peasants' Party of Italy
 : Workers' and Peasants' Party
 : Liberal and Centre Union
 : Bessarabian Peasants' Party
 : Farmers' Party, Peasants' League
 : Peasants' Party, National Peasants' Party, Agrarian Democratic Party, National Agrarian Party
 : Polish People's Party "Piast", Polish Peasant Bloc, Polish People's Party "Wyzwolenie", Stronnictwo Chłopskie
 : Agrarian Party
 : Peasants Party of Serbia
 : Agrarian Party
 : Agricultural Party
 : Crofters Party
 : Unbought Tenants' Association
 : People's Bloc, Peasant Democratic Party
 : Agrarian Party

Asia
 : Social Agrarian Party

Africa

Oceania
 : Country Party

References

See also
Nordic agrarian parties
Krestintern
International Agrarian Bureau